The Ata-Meken Socialist Party (sometimes shortened to simply Ata-Meken) is a social-democratic political party in Kyrgyzstan. Its current Chairman and founder is Omurbek Tekebayev, who is a former speaker of the Kyrgyz Parliament. The party was registered on December 16, 1992, following a split between Tekebayev (as well as more moderate party members) and the conservative Erkin Kyrgyzstan party. Ata-Meken eventually moved into the centre-left of the political spectrum.

The party's platform calls for a democratic state, economic reforms and evolutionary social development. It favours reasonable compromise between various social sectors and government bodies. The party supported Tekebayev in the 2000 Presidential elections, where he came second with 14%. On May 20, 2004, the party joined the For Fair Elections electoral alliance in preparing for the February 2005 parliamentary elections.

The party won one seat in the first round of the 2005 parliamentary elections.

Ata-Meken received the votes of 5.6% of eligible voters in the 2010 parliamentary elections, giving it 18 of 120 seats in parliament. This result made the party the fifth of five parties to surpass the support threshold of 5% of eligible voters necessary to enter parliament.

References

Political parties in Kyrgyzstan
Socialist parties in Asia
Political parties established in 1992